The German space programme is the set of projects funded by the government of Germany for the exploration and utilisation of outer space. The space programme is run by the German Aerospace Center, who conduct research, plan, and implement the programme on behalf of the German federal government.

History

Between 1930s and 1940s, Nazi Germany researched and built operational ballistic missiles capable of suborbital spaceflight. Starting in the early 1930s, during the last stages of the Weimar Republic, German aerospace engineers experimented with liquid-fueled rockets, with the goal that one day they would be capable of reaching high altitudes and traversing long distances. The head of the German Army's Ballistics and Munitions Branch, Lieutenant Colonel Karl Emil Becker, gathered a small team of engineers that included Walter Dornberger and Leo Zanssen, to figure out how to use rockets as long-range artillery in order to get around the Treaty of Versailles' ban on research and development of long-range cannons. Wernher von Braun, a young engineering prodigy, was recruited by Becker and Dornberger to join their secret army programme at Kummersdorf-West in 1932. Von Braun dreamed of conquering outer space with rockets and did not initially see the military value in missile technology.

During the Second World War, General Dornberger was the military head of the army's rocket programme, Zanssen became the commandant of the Peenemünde army rocket centre, and von Braun was the technical director of the ballistic missile programme. They led the team that built the Aggregat-4 (A-4) rocket, which became the first vehicle to reach outer space during its test flight programme in 1942 and 1943. Its supersonic speed meant there was no defence against it, and radar detection provided little warning. Germany used the weapon to bombard southern England and parts of Allied-liberated western Europe from 1944 until 1945. After the war, the V-2 became the basis of early American and Soviet rocket designs.

At war's end, American, British, and Soviet scientific intelligence teams competed to capture Germany's rocket engineers along with the German rockets themselves and the designs on which they were based. Each of the Allies captured a share of the available members of the German rocket team, but the United States benefited the most with Operation Paperclip, recruiting von Braun and most of his engineering team, who later helped develop the American missile and space exploration programmes. The United States also acquired a large number of complete V2 rockets.

Organisations

German Aerospace Center

Institute of Space Propulsion

Mission control centres

Columbus Control Centre

European Space Operations Centre

German Space Operations Center

Astronauts

As of 2018, eleven Germans have been in space. The first German, and only East German, in space was Sigmund Jähn in 1978. Three astronauts – Ulf Merbold, Reinhard Furrer and Ernst Messerschmid – represented West Germany during the time of divided Germany. Merbold made two other spaceflights after Germany was reunified in 1990; thus, he is the only German to have been in space three times. Thomas Reiter and Alexander Gerst are the only Germans to have made long-term spaceflights. The other five astronauts are Klaus-Dietrich Flade, Hans Schlegel, Ulrich Walter, Reinhold Ewald, and Gerhard Thiele.

Rockets

V-2

TEXUS

Liquid fly-back booster

SpaceLiner

RETALT

Missions operated by Germany

MW 18014

Helios

STS-61-A

STS-55

SAMPEX

ABRIXAS

DLR-Tubsat

TerraSAR-X

Columbus

Proposed missions

Baden-Württemberg 1

LEO

See also

Notes

References

Sources

External links
 German technology in 1969
 German technology and the Moon October 2019

 
Science and technology in Germany